Arab al-Nufay'at was a Palestinian Arab village in the Haifa Subdistrict. It was depopulated during the 1947–1948 Civil War in Mandatory Palestine on 10 April 1948. It was located 45 km south of Haifa.

History
The population in the  1945 statistics  was 820, all Muslims, with a total of 8,937 dunams of land; of which 1,471 was public land, the rest owned by Jews.

In 1945 Mikhmoret was established  on village lands, south of the site.

1948, and after
On 6 April 1948, the Haganah implemented a new policy for the coastal plains, namely of clearing the whole area of its Arab inhabitants. On 10 April the villagers of Arab al-Nufay'at, together with the villagers of Arab al-Fuqara and Arab Zahrat al-Dumayri, were ordered to leave the area.

In 1992 the village site was described: "The only traces left of the village is one house, which is still inhabited by an Arab family, and an old mulberry tree. The Israeli army has established a military camp that covers a large area near the site. The rest of the surrounding land is planted in melons, wheat, and barley. Some mulberry and eucalyptus trees grows near the site."

References

Bibliography

External links
Welcome To 'Arab al-Nufay'at
'Arab al-Nufay'at, from Zochrot
Survey of Western Palestine, Map 7:   IAA, Wikimedia commons 
  

Arab villages depopulated prior to the 1948 Arab–Israeli War
District of Haifa